In molecular biology mir-484 microRNA is a short RNA molecule. MicroRNAs function to regulate the expression levels of other genes by several mechanisms.
The precursor hairpin of miR-484 is transcribed directly and contains a 7-methylguanylated cap. The biogenesis of miR-484 is independent of Drosha.

See also 
 MicroRNA

References

Further reading

External links 
 

MicroRNA
MicroRNA precursor families